The spouse of the prime minister of Australia, or partner of the prime minister of Australia, is generally a high-profile individual who assists the prime minister with ceremonial duties as well as performing various other functions.

With a few exceptions, the prime minister's spouse has been a public figure and the subject of media interest. Most have used the position to promote charitable causes. By convention, the spouse of the prime minister serves as the host of The Lodge and Kirribilli House, the official residences of the prime minister, and also assists the prime minister in welcoming foreign dignitaries to Parliament House and various other locations during ceremonial events. However, the position is unpaid and there are no official responsibilities.

Spouses often assist the prime minister at campaign events. However, only two prime ministers' spouses have held public office in their own right – Enid Lyons became the first woman elected to the House of Representatives several years after her husband's death in office, while Lucy Turnbull was Lord Mayor of Sydney over a decade before her husband became prime minister. Ethel Page held senior offices in the organisational wing of the Country Party.

The current prime minister, Anthony Albanese, is divorced; he has a partner, Jodie Haydon, who lives in her own home in Sydney. Albanese is the first divorcee to be appointed prime minister.

All prime ministers except John McEwen, Julia Gillard and Albanese were married for the duration of their term in office. McEwen was a widower during his short term; Gillard was in a domestic partnership with Tim Mathieson.

Until relatively recently it was uncommon for the spouse of a prime minister to have their own career. Zara Holt, a fashion designer, was the first to continue her career during her husband's term in office, and reputedly earned more money than him. Other businesswomen to hold the position have included Thérèse Rein, who ran an employment services company, and Margie Abbott, who ran a childcare centre. Bettina Gorton was an academic who lectured part-time at the Australian National University.

Role

The prime minister's spouse has no official duties. Some earlier spouses stayed mainly at home and took little part in public life. Although a prime minister's spouse may be unofficially referred to as Australia's "first lady" or "first bloke", a spouse does not receive a staff or official budget.

However, most recent prime ministers' spouses have been involved in charities or community organisations, working to raise public awareness, funds, and support for a range of causes.  They generally assist their partners in political campaigns, and participate in official duties that come with the position, such as hosting foreign dignitaries, and, in particular, entertaining the spouses of dignitaries; accompanying the prime ministers on national and international trips; attending conferences and functions; and speaking in public, particularly in the prime minister's constituency. They have attended the opening of Parliament; hosted visitors at The Lodge and Kirribilli House; visited Buckingham Palace, the White House, or the Japanese Imperial Palace; and been present at royal coronations and conferences.

Others were initially preoccupied with rearing children, most notably Dame Enid Lyons (1932–39), who had 12 children (one died in infancy).  In 1943, four years after her husband's death in office, she was the first woman to be elected to the House of Representatives. She was a junior minister in the Menzies Government from 1949 to 1951.

Official recognition
Some prime ministers' spouses have received official recognition for their services to the community:
 Flora Reid, Mary Cook, Mary Hughes, Enid Lyons, Pattie Menzies and Zara Holt were given damehoods.
 Pattie Deakin accepted the award of Commander of the Order of the British Empire (CBE) in 1934, to be announced in the New Year's Honours of 1935; she died two days before the announcement.
 Margaret Whitlam, Tamie Fraser and Hazel Hawke were made officers of the Order of Australia. Lucy Turnbull was appointed an officer of the order before her husband became prime minister.

Tamie Fraser was the first spouse of a prime minister to be provided with an official secretary for dealing with her correspondence.

List of spouses or partners

Others
A number of prime ministers have remarried after leaving office or had marriages that ended before taking office.

 Billy Hughes was in a common-law marriage with Elizabeth Cutts from approximately 1890 to her death in 1906. He had six children with her, and also raised her son from a previous relationship.
 Chris Watson married Antonia Dowlan in 1925, following the death of his first wife Ada in 1921. They had one daughter together.
 Earle Page married Jean Thomas in 1959, following the death of his first wife Ethel in 1958. She had previously been his personal secretary.
 John McEwen married Annie McLeod in 1921; she died in 1967, ten months before he became prime minister. He remarried in 1968 to Mary Byrne, who had previously been his personal secretary.
 John Gorton married Nancy Home in 1993, following the death of his first wife Bettina in 1983.
 Bob Hawke married Blanche d'Alpuget in 1996, after divorcing his first wife Hazel in 1994. D'Alpuget had previously been his biographer.
 Paul Keating divorced Annita Keating after leaving office. He has not remarried, though his domestic partner since 1998 has been Julieanne Newbould.
 Anthony Albanese is the first prime minister to have been divorced before being appointed, having previously been married to Carmel Tebbutt from 2000 until 2019.

See also
 List of prime ministers of Australia
 List of prime ministers of Australia by time in office
 First Lady
 Viceregal consort of Australia

Notes

References

Further reading

 
Prime Minister of Australia
Spouses of the Prime Minister
Australia